St. Vincent de Paul Church is a historic parish church of the Roman Catholic Archdiocese of Chicago located in Chicago, Illinois. The parish was founded by the Vincentians in 1875. It is affiliated with DePaul University.

History
First known as "Father Smith's Farm", St. Vincent de Paul Parish was founded by Rev. Edward Smith, C.M., in 1875 at the corner of Webster Avenue and Osgood Street (now Kenmore Avenue) for German and Irish Catholics. This multi-use structure served as the church, school, parish hall, and rectory until 1891, when St. Vincent's School was established in a separate building.

With the original building now largely vacated, the structure was heavily remodeled, adding a third floor, and was repurposed as the home of the new St. Vincent's College in 1898. This school later became DePaul University.

After the school's opening, planning started on the current church building at Webster and Sheffield Avenues. The new St. Paul's Church was dedicated on May 1, 1897 by Patrick Feehan, Archbishop of Chicago.

Architecture
The new church was designed by James J. Egan of the firm of Egan & Prindeville, in the Romanesque Revival style with Gothic touches. The church is constructed of Indiana limestone and is considered representative of his best work. Its twin towers stand 140 feet tall.

Interior
Four large columns are used at the intersection of the nave and the transepts allowing for an uninterrupted view of the sanctuary, a somewhat unusual approach at the time. The stained glass is by Mayer & Company of Munich, Germany. The window in the west transept depicts Saint Vincent de Paul, patron of the church and founder of the Congregation of the Mission. The east transept window depicts Christ the King.

A new south rose window was created by Conrad Schmitt Studios of New Berlin, Wisconsin to replace the original destroyed in a fire in 1955. The twenty-two foot window "was designed with the theme ‘Sun of Splendor,’ symbolizing God and the blessings that radiate from him. Eight doves represent the beatitudes, while twelve angels holding stars symbolize the twelve divine praises."

John A. Mallin painted the ceiling of the apse. The Carrara marble altar was designed by Augustine O'Callahan and features inlaid mother-of-pearl and mosaics. The altar displays lilies, acanthus leaves, passion flowers, and shafts of wheat carved by Carl Beil.

References

Bibliography

-->

External links
 
 St. Vincent de Paul Parish's website
 Congregation of the Mission's website
 Photo of interior
 Picture of the rose window

Vincent de Paul
Congregation of the Mission
Roman Catholic churches completed in 1897
Religious organizations established in 1875
19th-century Roman Catholic church buildings in the United States